New Toys is a 1925 American comedy film directed by John S. Robertson and written by Josephine Lovett and Agnes Smith. It is based on the 1924 play New Toys by Oscar Hammerstein II and Milton Herbert Gropper. The film stars Richard Barthelmess, Mary Hay, Katherine Wilson, Clifton Webb, Francis Conlon, and Bijou Fernandez. The film was released on March 1, 1925, by First National Pictures.

Plot
As described in a film magazine review, Will Webb accepts tickets to an amateur performance from his fiancee, Natalie, as she sails for Europe, and there he meets and falls in love with Mary Lane. He marries her. They live in a Harlem flat and have a baby. Natalie returns, still considering that Will belongs to her. She visits them, throwing Will into terror and arousing Mary’s jealousy. Natalie tries to win Will back, and Mary accepts Tom  awrence’s suggestion that she should have a career for herself on the stage. The premiere is a complete flop due to a trip and the antics of her false nose. Will fears Mary has killed herself. He escapes from Natalie and finds Mary still in her dressing room at the theatre. They are reconciled.

Cast

Preservation
With no prints of New Toys located in any film archives, it s a lost film.

References

External links

Lobby card at Getty Images

1925 films
1920s English-language films
Silent American comedy films
1925 comedy films
First National Pictures films
Films directed by John S. Robertson
American silent feature films
American black-and-white films
1920s American films